Grzegorz Wicenty Sarata (born December 7, 1970 in Szczawnica) is a Polish slalom canoer who competed from the late 1980s to the mid-1990s. He finished 13th in the C-1 event at the 1992 Summer Olympics in Barcelona.

References
 

1970 births
Canoeists at the 1992 Summer Olympics
Living people
Olympic canoeists of Poland
Polish male canoeists
People from Nowy Targ County
Sportspeople from Lesser Poland Voivodeship